Erin Smith (born August 16, 1972) in Washington, D.C., is best known for being the guitarist of riot grrrl band Bratmobile, a band with drummer Molly Neuman and vocalist Allison Wolfe.

History 
Smith started her zine Teenage Gang Debs in 1987 with her brother Don. In 1991, she started interning at Sassy magazine, where she wrote articles about independent music and exposed girls to DIY culture.

Also in 1991, Smith started playing guitar in Bratmobile with Molly Neuman on drums and Allison Wolfe on vocals. The band was active until 1994, when they went on hiatus. During this hiatus, Smith and Wolfe started a new band Cold Cold Hearts. Bratmobile reformed in 1999, but split again in 2003 after two more albums. Smith later took over management of Lookout! records.

With Bratmobile

Studio albums 
 Pottymouth (1993) LP/CD/CS (Kill Rock Stars)
 Ladies, Women and Girls (2000) CD/LP, (Lookout! Records)
 Girls Get Busy (2002) CD/LP (Lookout! Records)

EPs 
 The Real Janelle (1994) LPEP/CDEP (Kill Rock Stars)

Live albums 
 The Peel Session CDEP (Strange Fruit)

Singles 
 Kiss & Ride 7-inch (Homestead Records)

Split 7-inch 
 Tiger Trap/ Bratmobile split 7-inch (4-Letter Words)
 Heavens to Betsy/ Bratmobile split 7-inch (K Records)
 Brainiac/ Bratmobile split 7-inch (12X12)
 Veronica Lake/ Bratmobile split 7-inch (Simple Machines)

Compilation albums 
 Kill Rock Stars compilation, CD/LP, (Kill Rock Stars)
 A Wonderful Treat compilation cassette
 The Embassy Tapes cassette
 Throw compilation CD (Yoyo Recordings)
 International Pop Underground live LP/CD/CS (K Records)
 Neapolitan Metropolitan boxed 7-inch set (Simple Machines)
 Teen Beat 100 compilation 7-inch (Teen Beat)
 Julep compilation LP/CD (Yo Yo)
 Wakefield Vol. 2 V/A CD boxed set (Teen Beat)
 Plea For Peace Take Action compilation CD (Sub City)
 Boys Lie compilation CD (Lookout! Records)
 Yo Yo A Go Go 1999 compilation CD (Yoyo Recordings)
 Lookout! Freakout Episode 2 compilation CD (Lookout! Records)
 Songs For Cassavetes compilation CD (Better Looking Records)
 Lookout! Freakout Episode 3 CD (Lookout! Records)
 Turn-On Tune-In Lookout! DVD (Lookout! Records)

With Cold Cold Hearts

Studio albums 
Cold Cold Hearts (1997)

Singles 
Yer So Sweet (Baby Donut) (1996)

Notes

External links 
 Kill Rock Stars, Bratmobile's record label (1991–1994)
 Lookout! Records, Bratmobile's record label (1999–2003)

1972 births
Living people
American punk rock guitarists
Riot grrrl musicians
Bratmobile members
20th-century American women guitarists
20th-century American guitarists
21st-century American women guitarists
21st-century American guitarists